Sword of the Bushido is a 1990 action film directed by Adrian Carr and starring Richard Norton.

References

External links

Australian television films
1990 films
1990s action films
1990s English-language films